Ecclesiastical privilege may refer to:

One of the Ecclesiastical Privileges of the Canon law of the Catholic Church
Priest–penitent privilege
Ecclesiastical privilege (Jehovah's Witnesses), a privilege enjoyed by the appointed elders of Jehovah's Witnesses in lieu of a special class of clergy